Alfred Edward Elvin Mills (15 December 1874 - 15 October 1929) was an English footballer who played as a defender for Spanish club Athletic Club. He is best known for being the only foreigner between the 33 founders of the club, the ‘Inglés en Bilbao’. Mills was one of the most important footballers in the amateur beginnings of Athletic Club, co-founding the club and then serving the club as a board member and a captain, winning the 1904 Copa del Rey.

Biography
Alfred Mills was born on 15 December 1874 in Lizard, Cornwall. At some point in the early 1890s, Mills arrived in Bilbao with his father to work for the cable company that connected Spain and Great Britain by telephone. He came to the city for work, like many other Britons who moved to Bilbao. In the early 1890s, Mills was one of the British workers who founded the Bilbao Football Club, a team that played several matches in the Hippodrome of Lamiako against the Club Atleta, a football that mainly consisted of the British workers of the Nervión Shipyards. Bilbao FC, however, was not linked to the shipyards, and in fact, Mills was a telegraph operator.

On 5 September 1901, Alfred Mills was one of the 33 founding members signing the statutes (signed as Alfredo Mills) in the infamous meeting held in the Café García, which officially established Athletic Club. He was the only foreign-born person among the 33 who signed the documents. In fact, the 1901 statutes even named him as the captain of the second team and therefore a member of the first board of directors.

In addition to being a founding member and a club captain, Mills was a regular starter on the pitch too, playing as a defender, who could also play in midfield. Mills lined up in several of Bilbao’s earlier matches, mostly against local rivals Bilbao FC, who was mostly made up of British. Athletic Bilbao only had one foreigner in its ranks, Alfred Mills, while Bilbao FC had several. He initially played defense in a partnership with Pedro (Perico) Larrañaga and later went on to play in midfield with another Englishman, George Cockram. His attacking game, according to the chronicles of the time, was terrible, meaning that his goals would always admire everyone. In 1902, Athletic and Bilbao FC agreed to join the best players of each club to play two games against the Bordeaux-based side Burdigala. This temporary merge became known as Club Bizcaya, and Mills was part of the first-ever line-up of the Bizcaya team, a 0–2 away win at Burdeos. Three weeks later, on 31 March 1902, he was again in Bizcaya's starting XI for the return fixture at home, the first visit by a foreign team to Bilbao, helping his side to a 7–0 win over the French side.

In the 1904 Copa del Rey Final, Athletic was declared winners again without playing a single match since their opponents failed to turn up. The Englishman was intermittently involved in matches throughout the rest of the decade, remaining involved in some of the first feats and most important moments of Athletic Club’s early history, being part of the first-ever athletic line-up that faced Madrid FC (now Real Madrid CF) on 24 April 1904. On this occasion, Bilbao won by 2 goals to 1. He was also a good cyclist, it was normal to see him on the streets of Bilbao with his bicycle.

Personal life
He married Fructuosa Rafaela del Valle Rubio and had two children. Although he lived in Logroño, an attack of uremia made him come to Algorta, where he worked in a telegraph company and where he would die on 15 October 1929, at the age of 54. It was his own son John, who took up his job in the telegraph company.

Honours
Copa del Rey: 1904

References

1874 births
1929 deaths
Spanish footballers
Athletic Bilbao footballers
Footballers from Bilbao
Association football defenders